Sonic Healthcare Limited is a Sydney-based, Australian company that provides laboratory services, pathology, and radiology services.

Scope

Sonic Healthcare Limited has a presence in Australia, New Zealand, United States, United Kingdom, Germany, Switzerland, Belgium and Ireland. It is the largest medical laboratory provider in Australasia and in Europe, and the third largest in the US. In 2015, it employed over 37,000 people.

The company is now part of the S&P/ASX 50, and is one of the largest medical companies listed on the ASX. The others are CSL Limited, Cochlear, and ResMed. The company strategy is growth by acquisition of overseas companies. With many critiques arguing that such a strategy can lead to over diversification, yet has seemingly worked well to expand its business

Annual Revenues for Financial Year to June 30, 2019, exceeded A$6.2 billion. Dr Colin Goldschmidt is the CEO and Managing Director.

History

The company was listed on the Australian Stock Exchange in 1987 as Sonic Technology Australia Ltd. It had its roots in the pathology practice of Douglass Laboratories.

In 1991, Douglass Laboratories opened a pathology branch in Adelaide, South Australia.

In 1992, the company acquired, then merged with, the Adelaide pathology practice Clinpath Laboratories.

In 1993, Dr Colin Goldschmidt was appointed Managing Director for the group of laboratories.

In 1994, Sonic Healthcare acquired and merged with Sydney's Tan Pathology.

In 1995, Sonic Healthcare acquired the Adelaide practice Pathlab making it part of Clinpath Laboratories. The company also formally changed from Sonic Technology to Sonic Healthcare Limited.

In 1996, Sonic Healthcare acquired New South Wales-based companies Hanly Moir Pathology and Barratt and Smith Pathologists, and Canberra-based Barratt Smith Moran Pathology. Douglass Laboratories merged operations with Hanly Moir Pathology to form Douglass Hanly Moir Pathology. Sonic Clinical Trials began operating from the Douglass Hanly Moir Pathology site at North Ryde. Sonic Healthcare became Australia's largest pathology group.

In 1997, Barratt Smith Moran Pathology changed its name to Capital Pathology.
Sonic Healthcare acquired Lifescreen Australia.

In 1998, Sonic Healthcare acquired two pathology operations from Alpha Healthcare: Australian Diagnostics Laboratories (which was merged with Douglass Hanly Moir Pathology) in Sydney and Southern Pathology, on the south coast of NSW. Southern Pathology continued to operate as a separate entity. It acquired the SGS groups: Sullivan Nicolaides Pathology (Queensland), Northern Pathology (Queensland), Melbourne Pathology (Victoria), Diagnostic Services (Tasmania), Diagnostic Medical Laboratories (New Zealand), Medlab Central (New Zealand), Medlab South (New Zealand), Valley Diagnostic Laboratories (New Zealand), and the New Zealand Radiology Group. This created the largest diagnostic group in Australasia and began the company’s diagnostic imaging.

In 2000, Sonic Healthcare established its Core Values and introduced new management structures. It also acquired Hitech Pathology (Victoria) that merged with Melbourne Pathology.

In 2001, Sonic Healthcare acquired Castlereagh Imaging (New South Wales), Castlereagh Imaging Hong Kong (HK), Hunter Imaging Group (New South Wales), Illawarra Radiology Group (New South Wales), Canterbury Medical Imaging (New Zealand), Palmerston North X-Ray (New Zealand), (through Sullivan Nicolaides Pathology) Consultant Pathologists in Townsville (Queensland) and Cairns Pathology Laboratory (Queensland), Queensland X-Ray Group, Illawarra Medical Laboratories (New South Wales), Clinipath Pathology (Western Australia), La Trobe Pathology (Victoria) and Bunbury Pathology (Western Australia) from Foundation Healthcare, and SKG Radiology (Western Australia's largest private diagnostic imaging practice).

In 2002, the company acquired The Doctors Laboratory, Britain's largest private pathology practice. Through Sullivan Nicolaides the company acquired the practice of Dr Tom Lynch in Rockhampton (Queensland). Through SKG Radiology, the company acquired Fremantle Radiology (Western Australia).

In 2003, Sonic Healthcare (through Douglass Hanly Moir Pathology) acquired the NSW Central Coast Pathology practice of Dr Richard Haskell. Sonic Healthcare (through Queensland X-Ray) acquired the Southside Diagnostic Services Group in Brisbane. In the UK, the company acquired Omnilabs Pathology (London), merging it into The Doctors Laboratory.

In 2004, The Doctors Laboratory formed a partnership with the National Health Service's University College of London Hospital. Sonic Healthcare acquired 56% ownership of the Schottdorf Group in Germany,  72% ownership of the Independent Practitioner Network Limited (IPN), the pathology operations of Endeavour HealthCare in NSW and WA merging them into Douglass Hanly Moir Pathology and Clinipath Pathology, and (through IPN) Endeavour's medical centre operations.

In 2005, Sonic Healthcare acquired an 82% interest in Clinical Pathology Laboratories, Inc. the largest privately owned regional pathology laboratory in the United States of America.

In 2006, Sonic Healthcare acquired Central Queensland Pathology Laboratory (Mackay, Queensland) merging it with Sullivan Nicolaides Pathology, Muskogee Clinical Laboratory (Muskogee, Oklahoma, USA), The Cognoscenti Health Institute (East Orlando, Florida, USA), and Lookadoo Skyline Laboratories (Port St Lucie, Florida, USA).

In 2007, the company established Sonic's USA's head office and acquired American Esoteric Laboratories (Tennessee and Texas), the remaining 18% of Clinical Pathology Laboratories,  Mullins Pathology & Cytology Laboratory P.C. (Augusta, Georgia, USA), Sunrise Medical Laboratories (a full-service clinical reference laboratory servicing Long Island and the New York metropolitan area), and Woodbury Clinical Laboratory (Lebanon, Tennessee). Sonic Healthcare entered the Swiss market by acquiring the Medica Laboratory Group (Zurich, Switzerland). It acquired the Bioscientia Healthcare Group (Ingelheim, Germany and the remaining equity in the Schottdorf Group. In Australia, Sonic Healthcare acquired LifeCheck (Sydney, NSW) merging it into Lifescreen.

In 2008, in the USA, Sonic Healthcare acquired American Clinical Services (New Jersey) merging it with Sunrise Medical Laboratories, Clinical Laboratories of Hawaii, and Pan Pacific Pathologists (Hawaii). In Europe, it acquired Labor Prof. Krech (Switzerland) merging it into Medica, Labor 28 (Berlin, Germany), GLP Medical Group (Hamburg, Germany), and 100% ownership of IPN which in turn acquired the Gemini Medical Group.

In 2009, the company established the German Sonic Executive Committee to coordinate its German operations. In the USA, Sonic Healthcare acquired Axiom Laboratories (Tampa, Florida) merging it with The Cognoscienti Health Institute, Piedmont Medical Laboratory (Winchester, Virginia), and East Side Clinical Laboratory (Rhode Island).

In 2010, Sonic Healthcare acquired Labor Lademannbogen (Hamburg, Germany) and Medhold Group (Antwerp, Belgium), and through the IPN the Prime Health Group. In the USA, the company acquired CBLPath (Rye Brook, NY) and Physician's Automated Laboratory (Bakersfield, California).

In 2011, Sonic acquired the Woestyn Laboratory (Belgium), cytopathology business Labor Dr. Steinberg (Germany), Central Coast Pathology (San Luis Obispo, California), and Allied Medical and Australian Skin Cancer medical centre groups.

In 2012, the company acquired Labor Oldenburg Dr. Müller (Germany) and the Western Australian pathology operations of Healthscope.

In 2013, IPN acquired the Australian Locum Medical Service group and Sonic acquired Labco S.A. Group (Germany).

In 2014, Sonic acquired San Pathology (Sydney).

In 2015, Sonic acquired Medisupport S.A (Switzerland) and Klinisch Laboratorium Declerck (Ardooie, Belgium). In Australia, the company acquired Adelaide Pathology Partners and the Medibank Workplace Health (WPH) and Travel Doctor businesses.

In 2016-2017, Sonic acquired 80% ownership of GLP systems (Hamburg, Germany). It acquired Staber Laboratory group (Munich, Germany), Medical Laboratory Bremen, and West Pacific Medical Laboratory (Los Angeles, California). The company partnered with Baptist Memorial Health Care to establish a bacteriology centre of excellence (Memphis, Tennessee), with Western Connecticut Health Network to form Constitution Diagnostics Network, and with NYU Health System to form NYU Langone Diagnostics (New York).

In 2018, Sonic acquired Pathology Trier (Germany). The company partnered with ProMedica Health System to form ProMedica Pathology Laboratories (Ohio and adjacent states).

In 2019, the company acquired Aurora Diagnostics (USA) and sold its interest in GLP systems (Germany).

In 2020 - 2021, Sonic acquired Pathologie Hamburg, a majority stake in Epworth Medical Imaging (Victoria, Australia) and in Harrison.ai's pathology solutions, Canberra Imaging Group, and ProPath (Dallas, Texas).

Other Acquisitions
 Medisupport, based in Switzerland, July 2015
 KLD in Belgium, July 2015
 the laboratory business of Central Coast Pathology Consultants (“CCPC”), a high quality laboratory in California, USA, February 2011
 Physicians’ Automated Laboratory (“PAL”), based in Bakersfield, California, USA, January 2011
 KBL-BML-Unilabo Laboratory (“KBL”), based in Antwerp and the Woestyn Laboratory, based in Mouscron,  January 2011
 US pathology firm CPL-Clinical Pathology Laboratories for $US123.5 million (A$121.5 million).
 Bioscientia Healthcare Group based in Ingelheim, Germany, August 2007

References

External links 
 

Companies based in Sydney
Companies listed on the Australian Securities Exchange
Australian companies established in 1987
Health care companies established in 1987
Medical technology companies of Australia